Fornæss is a Norwegian surname. Notable people with the surname include:

Dag Fornæss (born 1948), Norwegian speed skater
John Erik Fornæss (born 1946), Norwegian-American mathematician 

Norwegian-language surnames